BW284C51 is a selective acetylcholinesterase inhibitor. It is also a nicotinic antagonist.

See also
Cholinesterase inhibitor
Nicotinic antagonist

References

Acetylcholinesterase inhibitors
Quaternary ammonium compounds
Ketones
Allyl compounds
Bromides
Bisquaternary anticholinesterases